Thomas Christopher Williams (13 December 1908 – 14 August 1982) was an Irish first-class cricketer.

Williams was born at Dublin in December 1908, where he was educated in the city at Synge Street CBS. Initially playing his club cricket for Pembroke, Williams debuted for Ireland in a minor match against the Marylebone Cricket Club in 1937. He later made a single appearance in first-class cricket for Ireland against Scotland at Dublin in 1939. Batting twice in the match, Williams scored 23 runs in Ireland's first-innings, before he was dismissed by William Laidlaw; in their second-innings he was dismissed by William Dippie for 2 runs. He also took a single wicket during the match, dismissing John Farquhar in Scotland's first-innings, with match figures of 1/50. He was employed by Bulmers Irish Cider, with his work commitments necessitating a move from Dublin to Clonmel in County Tipperary, where he played club cricket for Cahir Park Cricket Club. He died at Clonmel in August 1982.

References

External links

1908 births
1982 deaths
Irish cricketers
Cricketers from Dublin (city)
People educated at Synge Street CBS